Pinoy Weekly is published by PinoyMedia Center. Inc., a nongovernment organization devoted to democratizing the practice of journalism in the country, and focuses on investigative stories that concern what it terms as the "underreported" sectors of Philippine society: peasants, workers, overseas Filipinos, youth, indigenous peoples, and women. It is currently a weekly print and online newsmagazine, and previously published special print issues, a Mindanao edition, international editions in Israel, Taiwan, and Japan. 

Pinoy Weeklys writers have previously been finalists for the Jaime V. Ongpin Awards for Excellence in Journalism. It has also been cited by the Center for Media Freedom and Responsibility, in the November 2006 issue of the Philippine Journalism Review: "If other tabloids are known for their sensationalized stories on crime and sex or splashy entertainment and sports pages, Pinoy Weekly comes across as a serious paper with analyses on issues affecting citizens, especially the marginalized." 

Currently, it is run by an editorial team: Neil Ambion, Jobie Adan and Darius R. Galang. Former editors and writers include Kenneth Roland A. Guda, Ilang-Ilang D. Quijano, Soliman A. Santos, Macky Macaspac, RC Asa, D'Jay Lazaro, Sharon Cabusao, Angel Tesorero, and Prestoline Suyat. It also features columns from progressive writers Rolando B. Tolentino, Teo S. Marasigan, Atty. Remigio Saladero Jr., Gert Ranjo-Libang, Jerome Adonis, Vencer Crisostomo, Anton Dulce, Danilo Arana Arao, Danilo Ramos, Jun Cruz Reyes, Boy Villasanta, Mark Angeles, Mykel Andrada, Steven Abada, Ericson Acosta, Rogelio Ordoñez, poetry group Kilometer 64, Carlos Conde, Antonio Tujan, and Deo Macalma. It also has regular contributions from other committed writers, photographers and artists.

Among its previous editorial consultants are visual artist and former dean of the University of the Philippines College of Fine Arts Leonilo Doloricon, University of the Philippines journalism professor and columnist Luis Teodoro, National Artist for Literature Dr. Bienvenido Lumbera, nationalist writer and former editor in chief Rogelio Ordonez, and writer, playwright, director and activist Bonifacio P. Ilagan. 

Current PMC board of trustees include Teodoro, Lumbera, and Ilagan, as well as Dr. Rolando B. Tolentino, JL Burgos, Kenneth Guda, and poet-musician Jesus Manuel Santiago.

References

External links
 http://www.pinoyweekly.org

Magazines established in 2002
Magazines published in the Philippines
Independent magazines
News magazines published in Asia
Weekly news magazines